McPherson is a surname.

McPherson may also refer to:

People 
 McPherson Meade, Montserratian cricketer
 Rosamond McPherson "Roz" Young (1912–2005), American columnist, author, educator and historian

Places

In the United States

Specific locations 
 McPherson College, a liberal arts college in Kansas
 McPherson Museum, a local history museum in McPherson, Kansas 
 McPherson Square, a public square in Washington, D.C.
 McPherson Square (Washington Metro), a station on the Washington Metro
 McPherson Town Historic District, a neighborhood of Dayton, Ohio

Towns 
 Fort McPherson, Georgia, a US Army military base
 McPherson, Kansas, in McPherson County
 McPherson Township, Sherman County, Kansas
 McPherson Township, Blue Earth County, Minnesota

Counties 
 McPherson County, Kansas
 McPherson County, Nebraska
 McPherson County, South Dakota

Elsewhere 
 MacPherson, Singapore, a region of Singapore
 Division of McPherson, an Australian Electoral Division in Queensland
 Fort McPherson, Northwest Territories, a town in the Northwest Territories, Canada
 McPherson Range, a mountain range in Australia
 Macpherson Stadium and Macpherson Playground, in Hong Kong

See also 
 Macpherson, a surname
 McPhearson, a surname